The National Coordination Committee for Workers' Education (NCCWE) is a national trade union centre in Bangladesh. The centre unites 14 national trade union federations. It is affiliated with the International Trade Union Confederation, the World Federation of Trade Unions and the International Transport Workers Federation. It is also supported by the International Labour Organization.

Affiliated trade union federations
 Bangladesh Labour Federation
 Jatiyo Sramik League
 Bangladesh Trade Union Centre
 Mohila Sramik League
 Several more

History
Following the Rana Plaza collapse in 2013, NCCWE joined the Rana Plaza Coordination Committee, which had been formed to oversee payments to affected workers and their families.

In 2016, NCCWE took part in a project through which workers who were killed by accidents on their workplaces would receive 50,000 taka (~€487/$590) in compensation.

In 2018, NCCWE together with the IndustriALL Bangladesh Council formed the Workers' Resource Centre, an NGO dedicated to supporting unions and workers in Bangladesh.

References

National trade union centres of Bangladesh